Irrel was a former Verbandsgemeinde ("collective municipality") in the district Bitburg-Prüm, in Rhineland-Palatinate, Germany. The seat of the Verbandsgemeinde was in Irrel. On 1 July 2014 it merged into the new Verbandsgemeinde Südeifel.

The Verbandsgemeinde Irrel consisted of the following Ortsgemeinden ("local municipalities"):

References

Former Verbandsgemeinden in Rhineland-Palatinate